The Hitch-Hiker is a 1953 American film noir thriller co-written and directed by Ida Lupino, starring Edmond O'Brien, William Talman and Frank Lovejoy, about two friends taken hostage by a hitchhiker during an automobile trip to Mexico.

The Hitch-Hiker was the first American mainstream film noir directed by a woman. It was selected in 1998 for preservation in the United States National Film Registry as being "culturally, historically or aesthetically significant."

The film was a fictionalized version of the Billy Cook murder spree.

Plot
In the early 1950’s, a hitchhiker robs and kills a succession of people who offer him rides. A suspect, Emmett Myers (Talman), is publicized in newspaper headlines.

Two friends, Roy Collins (O'Brien) and Gilbert Bowen (Lovejoy) are driving in southern California toward a planned fishing trip in the Mexican town of San Felipe on the Gulf of California. Just south of Mexicali, they pick up Myers, who pulls a gun and takes them hostage.

Myers forces them to journey over dirt roads into the Baja California Peninsula toward Santa Rosalía, where he plans to take a ferry across the Gulf of California to Guaymas.

Myers terrorizes and humiliates the two men, at one point forcing Bowen, standing a long distance away, to shoot a tin can out of Collins' hand. One night during their one attempt to escape, Collins hurts his ankle.

When the car is damaged, Myers forces them to continue on foot despite Collins' injury. Myers ridicules the two men for missing opportunities to escape for fear the other might be killed. He boasts, "You can get anything at the end of a gun."

Police in the U.S. and Mexico are hunting Myers, and authorities know that he has abducted the two men, who hear this on the radio. They understand that their lives are in danger. To mislead Myers, the police purposely alter information to suggest they think he is still in the United States.

Arriving at Santa Rosalía, Myers tries to conceal his identity by forcing Collins to wear his clothes. Discovering the regular ferry to Guaymas has burned, he hires a fishing boat. A local resident discovers his identity and contacts authorities, who are waiting at the pier. After a shootout and scuffle, Myers is arrested and Collins and Bowen are freed unharmed.

Cast
 Edmond O'Brien as Roy Collins
 Frank Lovejoy as Gilbert Bowen
 William Talman as Emmett Myers
 José Torvay as Captain Alvarado
 Wendell Niles as Himself (Radio Announcer).
 Jean Del Val as Inspector General
 Clark Howat as Government Agent
 Natividad Vacío as Jose
 Rodney Bell as William Johnson

Background

The film was based on the murder spree of Billy Cook, who in 1950, murdered a family of five and a traveling salesman, then kidnapped Deputy Sheriff Homer Waldrip from Blythe, California. Cook ordered his captive to drive into the desert, where he tied him up with blanket strips and took his police cruiser, leaving Waldrip to die. Waldrip got loose, however, walked to the main road, and got a ride back to Blythe. Cook also took hostage two men who were on a hunting trip.

Cook was tried, convicted, and received the death penalty. On December 12, 1952, Cook was executed in the gas chamber at San Quentin State Prison in California.

Production
The film was written by Lupino and her former husband Collier Young, based on a story by Daniel Mainwaring which was adapted by Robert L. Joseph.  Mainwaring did not receive a screen credit due to his then being on the Hollywood blacklist.

The Hitch-Hiker went into production on June 24, 1952, and wrapped in late July. The director of photography was RKO Pictures regular Nicholas Musuraca. Location shooting took place in the Alabama Hills near Lone Pine and Big Pine, California. Working titles for the film were "The Difference" and "The Persuader".

Lupino was a noted actress who began directing when Elmer Clifton got sick and couldn't finish the film he was directing for Filmakers Inc., the production company founded by Lupino and her husband Collier Young to make low-budget, issue-oriented movies. Lupino stepped in to finish the film and went on to direct her own projects. The Hitch-Hiker was her first hard-paced, fast-moving picture after four "women's" films about social issues.

Lupino interviewed the two prospectors whom Billy Cook had held hostage, and got releases from them and from Cook as well, so that she could integrate parts of Cook's life into the script. To appease the censors at the Hays Office, however, she reduced the number of deaths to three. The Hitch-Hiker premiered in Boston on March 20, 1953, to little fanfare and immediately went into general release. The film was marketed with the tagline: "When was the last time you invited death into your car?"

The film is in the public domain.

Reception

The Philadelphia Inquirer  said that "with nothing more than three able actors, a lot of rugged scenery and their own impressive talents as producers, authors and director, Collier Young and Ida Lupino have brewed a grim little chiller." The Inquirer critic praised the performances and said the film was "directed with masculine strength by the amazing Miss Lupino."

The New York Daily News gave the film three and a half of four stars, saying Lupino made "good and exciting use" of the real-life incident.

The New York Times called the film an "unrelenting but superficial study of abnormal psychology coupled with standard chase melodrama." Critic A.H. Weller complimented the performances and Lupino's "brisk direction," but criticized the plot as excessively predictable.

The Detroit Free Press said that the film performed a public service, by warning motorists about the dangers of picking up hitchhikers.

Legacy 
The film has been widely praised in the years since its release, and holds a 93% approval rating on Rotten Tomatoes, based on 43 reviews.

Critic John Krewson lauded the work of Ida Lupino, and wrote, As a screenwriter and director, Lupino had an eye for the emotional truth hidden within the taboo or mundane, making a series of B-styled pictures which featured sympathetic, honest portrayals of such controversial subjects as unmarried mothers, bigamy, and rape ... in The Hitch-Hiker, arguably Lupino's best film and the only true noir directed by a woman, two utterly average middle-class American men are held at gunpoint and slowly psychologically broken by a serial killer. In addition to her critical but compassionate sensibility, Lupino had a great filmmaker's eye, using the starkly beautiful street scenes in Not Wanted and the gorgeous, ever-present loneliness of empty highways in The Hitch-Hiker to set her characters apart.

Time Out Film Guide wrote of the film, Absolutely assured in her creation of the bleak, noir atmosphere – whether in the claustrophobic confines of the car, or lost in the arid expanses of the desert – Lupino never relaxes the tension for one moment. Yet her emotional sensitivity is also upfront: charting the changes in the menaced men's relationship as they bicker about how to deal with their captor, stressing that only through friendship can they survive. Taut, tough, and entirely without macho-glorification, it's a gem, with first-class performances from its three protagonists, deftly characterised without resort to cliché.

In January 2014, a restored 35mm print was premiered by the Film Noir Foundation at Noir City 12 at the Castro Theatre in San Francisco. On April 6, 2014 The Hitch-Hiker was shown again at the Egyptian Theatre in Hollywood. Mary Ann Anderson author of The Making of The Hitch-Hiker appeared at this event.

While most films noir were filmed in claustrophobic cities, The Hitch-Hiker was filmed in the desert southwestern United States (territory similar to that of Baja California, where most of the story takes place), mostly in wilderness and small villages. Critics Bob Porfiero and Alain Silver, in a review and analysis of the film, praised Lupino's use of shooting locations.  They wrote, "The Hitch-Hiker'''s desert locale, although not so graphically dark as a cityscape at night, isolates the protagonists in a milieu as uninviting and potentially deadly as any in film noir."

See also
 List of films in the public domain in the United States
 The Hitcher (1986 film)

References

Sources
 Foster, Gwendolyn Audrey. “The Narcissistic Sociopathology of Gender: Craig’s Wife and The Hitch-Hiker,” Part 2. Film International, March 9, 2014. 

External links

 The Hitch-Hiker essay by Wheeler Winston Dixon on the National Film Registry website 
 The Hitch-Hiker essay by Daniel Eagan in America's Film Legacy: The Authoritative Guide to the Landmark Movies in the National Film Registry, A&C Black, 2010 , pages 469-471 
 
 
 
 
 The Hitch-Hiker'' (2008 upload and 2009 upload) is available for free download at the Internet Archive
 

1953 films
1953 crime drama films
American black-and-white films
American crime drama films
American road movies
Crime films based on actual events
1950s English-language films
Film noir
Films about kidnapping
Films about automobiles
Films directed by Ida Lupino
Films scored by Leith Stevens
Films set in Mexico
Films about hitchhiking
RKO Pictures films
United States National Film Registry films
1950s American films